This is a list of state leaders in the 8th century (701–800) AD.

Africa

Africa: Northeast

Makuria (complete list) –
Merkourios, King (696–710)
Simeon, King (early 8th century)
Abraham, King (early 8th century)
Markos, King (mid 8th century)
Kyriakos, King (c.747–768)
Mikhael, King (c.785/794–804/813)

Africa: Northcentral

Ifriqiya (complete list) –
Abd al-Rahman ibn Habib al-Fihri, Emir (745–755)
Ilyas ibn Habib al-Fihri, Emir (755)
Habib ibn Abd al-Rahman al-Fihri, Emir (755–757)

Rustamid dynasty (complete list) –
ʿAbdu r-Rahman ibn Bahram ibn Rūstam (Bānū-Bādūsyān), Imam (776–788)
ʿAbdu l-Wahhab ibn Abd ar-Rahman, Imam (788–824)

Africa: Northwest

Barghawata (complete list) –
Tarif al-Matghari, King (?–744)
Ṣāliḥ ibn Tarīf, King (744–?)
Ilyâs ibn Sâlih, King (792–842)

Idrisid dynasty (complete list) –
Idris I, King (788–791)
Idris II, King (791–828)

Kingdom of Nekor (complete list) –
Salih I ibn Mansur, King (710–749)
al-Mu'tasim ibn Salih, King (749–?)
Idris I ibn Salih, King (?–760) 
Sa'id I ibn Idris, King (760–803)

Americas

Americas: Mesoamerica

Maya civilization

Calakmul (complete list) –
Yuknoom Took' K'awiil, King (c.702–731)
Wamaw K'awiil, King (c.736)
Ruler Y, King (c.741)
Great Serpent, King (c.751)
B'olon K'awiil, King (771–c.789)

Copán (complete list) –
Uaxaclajuun Ub'aah K'awiil, King (695–738)
Ajaw K'ak' Joplaj Chan K'awiil, King (738–749)
Ajaw K'ak' Yipyaj Chan K'awiil, King (749–763)
Yax Pasaj Chan Yopaat, King (763–post-810)
	
Palenque (complete list) –
K'inich Kan Bahlam II, Ajaw (684–702)
K'inich K'an Joy Chitam II, Ajaw (702–711)
K'inich Ahkal Mo' Nahb III, Ajaw (721–c.736)
K'inich Janaab Pakal II, Ajaw (c.764)
K'inich Kan Bahlam II, Ajaw (c.751)
K'inich K'uk' Bahlam II, Ajaw (764–c.783)
Janaab Pakal III, Ajaw (799–?)

Tikal (complete list) –
Jasaw Chan K'awiil I, Ajaw (682–734)
Yik'in Chan K'awiil, Ajaw (734–c.746)
28th Ruler, Ajaw (c.766–768)
Yax Nuun Ahiin II, Ajaw (768–c.794)
Nuun Ujol K'inich, Ajaw (c.800)

Asia

Asia: Central

Tibet

Tibetan Empire (complete list) –
Tridu Songtsen, Emperor (676–704)
Khri ma lod, Empress (675–689, 704–712)
Lha, Emperor (704–705)
Mé Aktsom, Emperor (705–755)
Trisong Detsen, Emperor (755–797) 
Muné Tsenpo, Emperor (797–c.799) 
Mutik Tsenpo, disputed Emperor (c.799)
Sadnalegs, Emperor (c.800/04–c.815)

Asia: East

Turks

Second Turkic Khaganate (complete list) –
Qapaghan, Qaghan (694–716)
Inel, Qaghan (716–717)
Bilge, Qaghan (717–734)
Yollig, Qaghan (734–739)
Tengli, Qaghan (c.740)
Kutluk Yabgu, Qaghan (741–742)
Özmiş, Qaghan (742–744)
Kulun Beg, Qaghan (744–745)

Uyghur Khaganate (complete list) –
Kutlug I Bilge, Khagan (744–747)
Bayanchur, Khagan (747–759)
Qutlugh tarqan sengün, Khagan (759–779)
Alp qutlugh bilge, Khagan (779–789)
Ai tengride bulmïsh külüg bilge, Khagan (789–790)
Qutlugh bilge, Khagan (790–795)
Ai tengride ülüg bulmïsh alp qutlugh ulugh bilge, Khagan (795–808)

China: Tang dynasty

Zhou dynasty –
Wu Zetian, Empress regnant (690–705)

Tang dynasty (complete list) –
Ruizong, Emperor (684–690, 710–712)
Shang, Emperor (710)
Ruizong, Emperor (684–690, 710–712)
Xuanzong, Emperor (712–756)
Suzong, Emperor (756–762)
Daizong, Emperor (762–779)
Dezong, Emperor (780–805)

Japan

Nara period Japan (complete list) –
Monmu, Emperor (697–707)
Genmei, Empress (707–715)
Genshō, Empress (715–724)
Shōmu, Emperor (724–749)
Kōken, Empress (749–758)
Junnin, Emperor (758–764)
Shōtoku, Empress (764–770)
Kōnin, Emperor (770–781)
Kanmu, Emperor (781–806)

Korea: North–South States Period

Balhae (complete list) –
Go, King (698–719)
Mu, King (719–737)
Mun, King (737–793)
Dae Won-ui, King (793)
Seong, King (793–794)
Gang, King (794–809)

Later Silla (complete list) –
Hyoso, King (692–702)
Seongdeok, King (702–737)
Hyoseong, King (737–742)
Gyeongdeok, King (742–765)
Hyegong, King (765–780)
Seondeok, King (780–785)
Wonseong, King (785–798)
Soseong, King (798–800)
Aejang, King (800–809)

Asia: Southeast

Cambodia

Chenla (complete list) –
Jayadevi, Queen (c.681–713)

Mataram Kingdom: Shailendra dynasty/Sanjaya dynasty (complete list) –
Sanjaya, King (732–746)
Panangkaran, King (760–775)
Dharanindra, King (775–800)
Samaragrawira, King (800–819)

Indonesia: Java

East Java –
Dewasimha, King (7th/8th century)
Gajayana, King (8th century)
A[…]nana, King (fl.760)

Kalingga Kingdom: Shailendra dynasty –
Shima, Queen (674—703)

Shailendra dynasty –
Mandimiñak, King (703—710)
Sanna, King (710—717)

Mataram Kingdom: Shailendra dynasty/Sanjaya dynasty (complete list) –
Sanjaya, King (716–746)
Panangkaran, King (760—775)
Dharanindra, King (775—800)
Samaragrawira, King (800—812)

Sunda Kingdom (complete list) –
Tarusbawa, Maharaja (669–723)
Sanjaya, Maharaja (723)
Rakeyan Panaraban, Maharaja (732–739)
Rakeyan Banga, Maharaja (739–766)
Rakeyan Medang Prabu Hulukujang, Maharaja (766–783)
Prabu Gilingwesi, Maharaja (783–795)
Pucukbumi Darmeswara, Maharaja (795–819)

Galuh Kingdom (complete list) –
Wretikandayun, Maharaja (612-702)
Mandiminyak, Maharaja (702-709)
Bratasena, Maharaja (709-716)
Purbasora, Maharaja (716-723)
Premanadikusuma, Maharaja (723-732)
Tamperan Barmawijaya, Maharaja (732-739)
Manarah, Maharaja (739-783)
Guruminda Sang Minisri, Maharaja (783-799)

Malaysia: Peninsular
Kedah Sultanate (complete list) –
DiMaharaja Putra II, Maharaja (c.660–712)
Darma Maharaja, Maharaja (c.712–788)
Maha Jiwa, Maharaja (c.788–832)

Thailand

Hariphunchai (complete list) –
Camadevi, Queen (7th/8th century)

Ngoenyang (complete list) –
Lao Sao, King (7th–8th century)
Lao Tang, King (early 8th century)
Lao Ghrom, King (mid 8th century)
Lao Lheaw, King (late 8th century)
Lao Gab, King (8th–9th century)

Vietnam

Champa (complete list) –
Vikrantavarman II, King (c.686–c.731)
Rudravarman II, King (c.731–c.758)
Prithindravarman, King (c.758–?)
Satyavarman, King (c.770–c.787)
Indravarman I, King (c.787–c.803)

Mai Uprising of Annam (complete list) –
Mai Thúc Loan, Emperor (713–723)

Phùng Uprising (complete list) –
Phùng Hưng, King (779–791)
Phùng An, King (791)

Asia: South

Afghanistan

Turk Shahi (complete list) –
Shahi Tegin, King (680–739)
Fromo Kesaro, King (739–745)
Bo Fuzhun, King (745–?)
Khinkhil, King (c.780–785)

Bengal and Northeast India

Kamarupa: Mlechchha dynasty (complete list) –
Kumara, King (695–710)
Vajra, King (710–725)
Harshavarman, King (725–745)
Balavarman II, King (745–760)
Salambha, King (795–815)

Khadga dynasty –
Rajabhat, King (673–707)
Balabhat, King (707–716)

Mallabhum (complete list) –
Adi Malla, King (694–710)
Jay Malla, King (710–720)
Kinu Malla, King (733–742)
Kanu Malla, King (757–764)
Shur Malla, King (775–795)

Pala Empire (complete list) –
Gopala I, King (8th century)
Dharmapala, King (8th–9th century)

India

Chahamanas of Shakambhari (complete list) –
Naradeva, King (c.709–721)
Ajayaraja I, King (c.721–734)
Vigraharaja I, King (c.734–759)
Chandraraja I, King (c.759–771)
Gopendraraja, King (c.771–784)
Durlabharaja I, King (c.784–809)

Chalukya dynasty (complete list) –
Vijayaditya, King (696–733)
Vikramaditya II, King (733–746)
Kirtivarman II, King (746–753)

Eastern Chalukyas (complete list) –
Mangi Yuvaraja, King (682–706)
Jayasimha II, King (706–718)
Kokkili, King (719)
Vishnuvardhana III, King (719–755)
Vijayaditya I (Eastern Chalukya), King (755–772)
Vishnuvardhana IV, King (772–808)

Western Ganga dynasty (complete list) –
Shivamara I, King (679–726)
Sripurusha, King (726–788) 
Shivamara II, King (788–816)

Gurjara-Pratihara dynasty (complete list) –
Nagabhata I, King (730–760)
Kakustha and Devaraja, Kings (760–780)
Vatsaraja, King (780–800)
Nagabhata II, King (800–833)

Kalachuris of Tripuri (complete list) –
Shankaragana I, King (750–775)

Maitraka dynasty (complete list) –
Śīlāditya III, King (c.690–c.710)
Śīlāditya IV, King (c.710–c.740)
Śīlāditya V, King (c.740–c.762)
Śīlāditya VI Dhrubhatta, King (c.762–c.776)

Pallava dynasty –
The Pallava dynasty has two chronologies of rulers.
Paramesvaravarman II, King (705–710)
Nandivarman II, King (mid/late 8th century)
Dantivarman, King (late 8th–early 9th century)

Pandyan dynasty (complete list) –
Kochadaiyan Ranadhiran, King (710–735)
Maravarman Rajasimha I, King (735–765)
Parantaka Nedunjadaiyan, King (765–815)
Rasasingan II, King (790–800)
Varagunan I, King (800–830)

Paramara dynasty of Malwa (complete list) –
Upendra, King (c.800–c.818)

Rashtrakuta dynasty (complete list) –
Dantidurga, King (735–756)
Krishna I, King (756–774)
Govinda II, King (774–780)
Dhruva Dharavarsha, King (780–793)
Govinda III, King (793–814)

Sisodia (complete list) –
Bappa Rawal, Rajput (728–753)
Khumman, Rajput (753–773)
Mathatt, Rajput (773–790)
Bhathabhatt, Rajput (790–813)

Sri Lanka

Anuradhapura Kingdom, Sri Lanka (complete list) –
Manavanna, King (691–726)
Aggabodhi V, King (726–732)
Kassapa III, King (732–738)
Mahinda I, King (738–741)
Aggabodhi VI, King (741–781)
Aggabodhi VII, King (781–787)
Mahinda II, King (787–807)

Asia: West

Syria

Umayyad Caliphate (complete list) –
Abd al-Malik, Caliph (685–705)
Al-Walid I, Caliph (705–715)
Sulayman, Caliph (715–717)
Umar II, Caliph (717–720)
Yazid II, Caliph (720–724)
Hisham, Caliph (724–743)
Al-Walid II, Caliph (743–744)
Yazid III, Caliph (744)
Ibrahim, Caliph (744)
Marwan II, Caliph (744–750)

Mesopotamia

Abbasid Caliphate, Baghdad (complete list) –
as-Saffah, Caliph (750–754)
al-Mansur, Caliph (754–775)
al-Mahdi, Caliph (775–785)
al-Hadi, Caliph (785–786)
Harun al-Rashid, Caliph (786–809)

Tabaristan

Dabuyid dynasty (complete list) –
Dabuya, Spahbed (660–712)
Farrukhan the Great, Spahbed (712–728)
Dadhburzmihr, Spahbed (728–740/741)
Farrukhan the Little, Spahbed (740/741–747/748) 
Khurshid, Spahbed (740–759/760)

Yemen

Yemeni Zaidi State (complete list) –
Al-Hasan al-Muthanna, Imam (680–706)
Zayd ibn Ali, Imam (706–740)
Hasan ibn Zayd ibn Hasan, Imam (740–783)
Muhammad ibn Ja'far al-Sadiq, Imam (783–818)

Europe

Europe: Balkans

First Bulgarian Empire (complete list) –
Tervel, Khan (7th–8th century)
Kormesiy, Khan (early 8th century)
Sevar, Khan (early-mid 8th century)
Kormisosh, Khan (mid 8th century)
Vinekh, Khan (754/756–762)
Telets, Knyaz (762–765)
Sabin, Khan (765–766)
Umor, Khan (766)
Toktu, Khan (766–767)
Pagan, Khan (767–768)
Telerig, Khan (768–777)
Kardam, Khan (777–803)

Byzantine Empire (complete list) –
Tiberios III, Emperor (698–705)
Justinian II, co-Emperor (681–685), Emperor (685–695, 705–711)
Tiberius, Co-Emperor (706–711)
Philippikos Bardanes, Emperor (711–713)
Anastasios II, Emperor (713–715)
Theodosius III, Emperor (715–717)
Leo III the Isaurian, Emperor (717–741)
Constantine V, co-Emperor (720–741), Emperor (741–780)
Artabasdos, Emperor (741–743)
Leo IV the Khazar, co-Emperor (751–775), Emperor (775–780)
Constantine VI, Co-Emperor (776–780), Emperor (780–797)
Irene, Regent (780–790, 792–797), Empress (797–802)

Croatia (complete list) –
Višeslav, Duke (c.785–c.802)

Principality of Serbia (complete list) –
Višeslav (fl. c.780)

Europe: British Isles

Great Britain: Scotland

Dál Riata (complete list) –
Fiannamail ua Dúnchado, King (?–700)
Béc ua Dúnchado, King (?–707)
Dúnchad Bec, King (?–721)
Selbach mac Ferchair, King (?–723)
Dúngal mac Selbaig, King (?–726)
Eochaid mac Echdach, King (726–733)
Muiredach mac Ainbcellaig, King (733–736)
Alpín mac Echdach, King (unknown)
Eógan mac Muiredaig, King (unknown)
Indrechtach mac Fiannamail, King (?–741)
Áed Find, King (pre–768–778)
Fergus mac Echdach, King (778–781)
Eochaid mac Áeda Find, King (unknown)
Caustantín mac Fergusa, King (unknown)

Picts (complete list) –
Bridei IV, King (697–706)
Nechtan, King (706–724, 728–729)
Drest VII, King (724–726)
Alpín I, King (726–728)
Óengus I, King (729–761)
Bridei V, King (761–763)
Ciniod I, King (763–775)
Alpín II, King (775–778)
Talorgan II, King (778–782)
Drest VIII, King (782–783)
Conall, King (785–789)
Constantine (I), King (789–820)

Kingdom of Strathclyde / Alt Clut (complete list) –
Beli II, King (694–722)
Teudebur, King (722–750)
Rotri, King (750–754)
Dumnagual III, King (754–760)
Eugein II(760–780)
Riderch II, King (780–798)
Cynan, King (798–816)

Isle of Man (complete list) –
, King (c.710)
Sandde, King (c.730)
Elidyr, King (c.790)

Great Britain: Northumbria

Kingdom of Northumbria (complete list) –
Ealdfrith, King (685–704/705)
Eadwulf I, King (704–705)
Osred I, King (705–716)
Coenred, King (716–718)
Osric, King (718–729)
Ceolwulf, King (729–737)
Eadberht, King (737/738–758)
Oswulf, King (758–759)
Æthelwald Moll, King (759–765)
Ealhred, King (765–774)
Æthelred I, King (774–779)
Ælfwald I, King (788–790)
Osred II, King (790–796)
Osbald, King (796)
Eardwulf, King (796–806/808)

Great Britain: England

The Britons (complete list) –
Geraint, King (c.670–c.710)
Rhodri Molwynog, King (c.712–754)
Cynan Dindaethwy, King (798–816)

Dumnonia (complete list) –
Donyarth ap Culmin, King (c.661–c.700)
Geraint of Dumnonia, King (c.700–c.710)

Kingdom of East Anglia (complete list) –
Ealdwulf, King (663–c.713)
Ælfwald, King (713–749)
Beonna, Co-King (749–c.760)
Alberht, Co-King (749–c.760)
Æthelred I, Sub-King (760s–770s)
Æthelberht II, King (c.779–794)
Offa, King (c.796), also King of Kent and of Mercia
Eadwald, King (c.796–c.800)

Kingdom of Essex (complete list) –
Sigeheard, Co-King (694–709)
Swæfred, Co-King (694–709)
Offa, King (709)
Sælred, Co-King (c.709–746)
Swæfberht, Co-King (c.715–738)
Swithred, King (746–758)
Sigeric, King (758–798)
Sigered
King (798–812)
Duke (812–825)

Kingdom of Kent (complete list) –
Wihtred, King (c.693–725)
Alric, King (725–?)
Eadbert I, King (725–748)
Æthelbert II, King (725–762)
Eardwulf, King (unknown)
Eadberht II, King (fl. 762)
Sigered, King (fl. 762)
Eanmund, King (unknown)
Heaberht, King (fl. 764–765)
Egbert II, King (fl. 765–779)
Ealhmund, King (fl. 784)
Eadberht III Præn, King (796–798)
Cuthred, King (797/798–807)

Mercia (complete list) –
Æthelred I, King (675–704)
Coenred, King (704–709)
Ceolred, King (709–716)
Ceolwald, King (c.716 )
Æthelbald, King (716–757)
Beornred, King (757)
Offa, King (757–796), also King of Kent and of East Anglia
Ecgfrith, King (796)
Coenwulf, King (796–821), also King of Kent and of East Anglia

Kingdom of Sussex (complete list) –
Noðhelm, King (fl. 692–717)
Watt, King (fl. 692–c.700)
Bryni, King (fl. c.700)
Osric?	]], King (fl. c.710)
Æðelstan, King (fl. 717)
Æðelberht, King (fl. c.740)
Osmund, King (fl. 760–772)
Oswald, King (fl. 772)
Oslac, King (fl. c.765–772)
Ealdwulf, King (fl. c.765–c.791)
Ælfwald, King (fl. c.765–772)

Kingdom of Wessex (complete list) –
Ine, King (688–726)
Æthelheard, King (726–740)
Cuthred, King (740–756)
Sigeberht, King (756–757)
Cynewulf, King (757–786)
Beorhtric, King (786–802)

Great Britain: Wales

Morgannwg (complete list) –
Morgan ab Athrwys, the Generous, King (fl.c.730)
Ithel ap Morgan, King (710/15–c.745)

Glywysing (complete list) –
Meurig ab Ithel, Rhodri, Rhys, each ruled part (c.755–785)
Arthfael Hen ap Rhys, King (785–c.825)

Gwent (complete list) –
Ffernfael ab Idwal, King (?–c.775)
Athrwys ap Ffernfael, King (774–810)

Kingdom of Gwynedd (complete list) –
Idwal Roebuck, King (c.682–c.720)
Rhodri Molwynog ap Idwal, King (c.720–c.754)
Caradog ap Meirion, King (c.754–c.798)
Cynan Dindaethwy ap Rhodri, King (c.798–816)

Kingdom of Powys (complete list) –
Gwylog ap Beli, King (695–725)
Elisedd ap Gwylog, King (725–c.755)
Brochfael ap Elisedd, King (c.755–773)
Cadell ap Brochfael, King (773–808)

Seisyllwg –
Arthen ap Seisyll, King (700–735)
, King (735–770)
, King (770–807)

Ireland

Ireland (complete list) –
Loingsech mac Óengusso, High King (694–701)
Congal Cennmagair, High King (702–708)
Fergal mac Máele Dúin, High King (709–718)
Fogartach mac Néill, High King (719)
Cináed mac Írgalaig, High King (720–722)
Flaithbertach mac Loingsig, High King (723–729)
Áed Allán, High King (730–738)
Domnall Midi, High King (739–758)
Niall Frossach, High King (759–765)
Donnchad Midi, High King (766–792)
Áed Oirdnide, High King (793–817)

Kingdom of Ailech (complete list) –
Fergal mac Máele Dúin, King (700–722)
Áed Allán mac Fergaile, King (722–743)
Niall Frossach mac Fergaile, King (743–770)
Máel Dúin mac Áedo Alláin, King (770–788)
Áed Oirdnide mac Néill, King (788–819)

Kingdom of Breifne (complete list) –
Dub Dothra, King (c.743)
Cormacc mac Duibh Dá Críoch, King (c.790)
Muircheartach mac Donnghal, King (c.800–806)

Connachta (complete list) –
Muiredach Muillethan, King (697–702)
Cellach mac Rogallaig, King (702–705)
Indrechtach mac Dúnchado, King (705–707)
Domnall mac Cathail, King (707–715)
Indrechtach mac Muiredaig, King (707/715–723)
Domnall mac Cellaig, King (723–728)
Cathal mac Muiredaig, King (728–735)
Áed Balb mac Indrechtaig, King (735–742)
Forggus mac Cellaig, King (742–756)
Ailill Medraige mac Indrechtaig, King (756–764)
Dub-Indrecht mac Cathail, King (764–768)
Donn Cothaid mac Cathail, King (768–773)
Flaithrí mac Domnaill, King (773–777)
Artgal mac Cathail, King (777–782)
Tipraiti mac Taidg, King (782–786)
Cináed mac Artgail, King (786–792)
Colla mac Fergusso, King (792–796)
Muirgius mac Tommaltaig, King (796–815)

Leinster (complete list) –
Cellach Cualann, King (693–715)
Murchad mac Brain Mut, King (715–727)
Dúnchad mac Murchado, King (727–728)
Fáelán mac Murchado, King (728–738)
Bran Becc mac Murchado, King (738)
Áed mac Colggen, King (738)
Muiredach mac Murchado, King (738–760)
Ruaidrí mac Fáeláin, King (776–785)
Bran ua Máele Dúin, King (785–795)
Fínsnechta Cethardec, King (795–808)

Kingdom of Meath (complete list) –
Domnall Midi mac Murchado, King (743–763)
Fallomon mac Con Congalt, King (c.763–766)
Donnchad Midi, King (766–797)
Domnall mac Donnchada Midi, King (797–799)
Muiredach mac Domnaill Midi, King (799–802)

Uí Maine (complete list) –
Seachnasach, King (691–711)
Dluthach mac Fithcheallach, King (711–738)
Cathal Maenmaighe, King (738–745)
Ailello hui Daimine, King (745–749)
Inreachtach mac Dluthach, King (749–750)
Aedh Ailghin, King (750–767)
Dunchadh ua Daimhine, King (767–780)
Conall mac Fidhghal, King (780–782)
Duncadho mac Duib Da Tuadh, King (784)
Amhalgaidh, King (786)
Ailell mac Inreachtach, King (786–791/799)
Dub Dá Leithe mac Tomaltach, King (?–816)

Ulaid / Ulster (complete list) –
Bécc Bairrche mac Blathmaic, King (692–707)
Cú Chuarán mac Dúngail Eilni, King (707–708)
Áed Róin, King (708–735)
Cathussach mac Ailello, King (735–749)
Bressal mac Áedo Róin, King (749–750)
Fiachnae mac Áedo Róin, King (750–789)
Tommaltach mac Indrechtaig, King (789–790)
Eochaid mac Fiachnai, King (790–810)

Europe: Central

Duchy of Alsace (complete list) –
Adalbert, Duke (post-683–723)
Gotfrid, Duke (?–709)
Willehari, Duke (709–712)
Lantfrid, Duke (709–730)
Liutfrid, Duke (723–742)
Theudebald, Duke (730–746)

Bavaria (complete list) –
Theodo, Duke (c.680–716)
Theodbert, co-Duke (c.716–c.719)
Theobald, co-Duke (c.716–c.719)
Tassilo II, co-Duke (c.716–c.719)
Grimoald, co-Duke (715–725)
Hugbert, Duke (725–736)
Odilo, Duke (736–748)
Grifo, Duke (c.788)
Tassilo III, Duke (748–788)

Civitas Schinesghe (complete list) –
Piast the Wheelwright, Duke (?–861)
Siemowit, Duke (9th century)

Prince-Bishopric of Mainz (complete list) –
Lullus, Prince-archbishop (754–786)
Richholf, Prince-archbishop (787–813)

Obotrites (complete list) –
Witzlaus, Prince (?–c.795)
Thrasco, Prince (?–c.800)

Old Saxony (complete list) –
Theoderic, Duke (fl.743–744)
Widukind, Duke (fl.777–785)
Abo, Duke (fl.785–811)

Sorbs –
Miliduch, Duke (fl.790–806)	

Duchy of Thuringia (complete list) –
Heden II, Duke (689–719)

Veleti –	
Dragovit, Prince (c.740–post-789)

Europe: East

Volga Bulgaria (complete list) – 
Kotrag, Potentate (675–710)
Irkhan, ruler (710–765)
Tuqyi, ruler (765–815)

Khazar Khaganate (complete list) –
Ashina dynasty: Khazar Khagans
Busir, Khagan (c.690–715)
Barjik, Khagan (late 720s–731)
Bihar, Khagan (c.732)
Prisbit, Regent? (late 730s)
Baghatur, Khagan (c.760)
Khazar Beks
Alp Tarkhan, Bek (early 8th century)
Tar'mach, Bek (c.730)
Hazer Tarkhan, Bek (?–737)
Bulanid dynasty
Obadiah, ruler (c.786–809)

Slavs of Lower Pannonia –
Vojnomir, Duke (c.791–c.810)
Ljudevit, Duke (c.810–c.823)
Ratimir, Duke (829–838)
Braslav, Duke (880–c.896)

Europe: Nordic

Sweden (complete list) –
House of Ynglings/Scylfings
Harald Hildetand, King (c.705–750)
Sigurd Hring, King (c.750–c.770)
Ragnar Lodbrok, King (c.770–c.785)
Östen Beli, King (late 8th century)
House of Ivar Vidfamne
Sigurd Hring, King (c.750–770)
Ragnar Lodbrok, King (c.770–785)
Östen Beli, King (late 8th century)

Europe: Southcentral

Principality of Benevento (complete list) –
Gisulf I, Duke (689–706)
Romoald II, Duke (706–730)
Audelais, Duke (730–732)
Gregory, Duke (733–739)
Godescalc, Duke (739–742)
Gisulf II, Duke (742–751)
Liutprand, Duke (751–758)
Arechis II, Duke (758–774)
Arechis II, Prince (774–787)
Grimoald III, Prince (787–806)

March of Istria –
Hunfrid, Margrave (c.799)

Kingdom of the Lombards (complete list) –
Liutpert, King (700–702)
Raginpert, King (701)
Aripert II, King (702–712)
Ansprand, King (712)
Liutprand, King (712–744)
Hildeprand, King (744)
Ratchis, King (744–749)
Aistulf, King (749–756)
Desiderius, King (756–774)

Kingdom of Italy, King (complete list) –
Charlemagne, King (774–814)
Pepin, King (781–810)

Papal States (complete list) –
Stephen II, Pope (752–757)
Paul I, Pope (757–767)
Stephen III, Pope (768–772)
Adrian I, Pope (772–795)
Leo III, Pope (795–816)

Duchy of Spoleto (complete list) –
Transamund I, Duke (665–703)
Faroald II, Duke (703–724)
Transamund II, Duke (724–739, 740–742, 744–745)
Hilderic, Duke (739–740)
Agiprand, Duke (742–744)
Lupus, Duke (745–752)
Unnolf, Duke (752)
Aistulf, Duke (752–756)
Ratchis, Duke (756–757)
Alboin, Duke (757–759)
Desiderius, Duke (758–759)
Gisulf, Duke (758–763)
Theodicius, Duke (763–773)
Hildeprand, Duke (774–788)
Winiges, Duke (789–822)

Republic of Venice (complete list) –
Paolo Lucio Anafesto, Doge (697–717)
Marcello Tegalliano, Doge (717–726)
Orso Ipato, Doge (726–737)
Dominicus Leo Abrogatis, Magister militum (737) 
Felice Cornicola, Magister militum (738)
Teodato Ipato, Magister militum (739)
Gioviano Cepanico Ipato, Magister militum (740)
Giovanni Fabriciaco, Magister militum (741)
Teodato Ipato, Doge (742–755)
Galla Gaulo, Doge (755–756)
Domenico Monegario, Doge (756–764)
Maurizio Galbaio, Doge (764–787)
Giovanni Galbaio, Doge (787–804)

Europe: Southwest

Iberian Peninsula

Kingdom of Asturias (complete list) –
Pelagius, King (718–737)
Favila, King (737–739)
Alfonso I, King (739–757)
Fruela I, King (757–768)
Aurelius, King (768–774)
Silo, King (774–783)
Mauregatus, King (783–788)
Bermudo I, King (788–791)
Alfonso II, King (791–842)

Emirate of Córdoba (complete list) –
Abd al-Rahman I, Emir (756–788)
Hisham I, Emir (788–796)
al-Hakam I, Emir (796–822)

Visigothic Kingdom (complete list) –
Egica, King (687–702)
Wittiza, King (694–710)
Roderic, King (710–711)
Agila II, King (711–714)
Oppas, King (712)
Ardo, King (714–721)

Marca Hispanica

County of Osona (complete list) –
Borrell, Count (798–820)

County of Cerdanya (complete list) –
Borrell, Count (798–820)

County of Urgell (complete list) –
Borrell, Count (798–820)

Europe: West

Champagne (complete list) –
Drogo, Duke (690–708)
Arnulf, Duke (707/08–c.723)

Frisian Kingdom (complete list) –
Redbad, King (678–719)
Poppo, King (719–734)

County of Paris (complete list) –
Grifo, Count (751–753)
Gerard I, Count (752–778)
Stephen, Count (778–811)

County of Poitou (complete list) –
Hatton, Count (735–778)
Renaud, Count (795–843)

Franks
Frankish Empire –
Kings (complete list) –
Childebert III, King (695–711)
Dagobert III, King (711–715)
Chilperic II, King (715–721)
Chlothar IV, King (717–720)
Theuderic IV, King (721–737)
Childeric III, King (743–751)
Mayors of the Palace (complete list) –
Pepin II of Herstal
Mayor of the Palace (680–714)
Duke and Prince of the Franks (687–714)
Charles Martel
Duke and Prince of the Franks (714–741)
Acting King of the Franks (737–741)
Pepin the Short
Mayor of the Palace (741–751)
King (751–768)

Frankish Empire –
Charlemagne, King (768–814), Holy Roman Emperor (800–814)

Austrasia of the Franks (complete list) –
Childebert III, King (695–711)
Dagobert III, King (711–715)
Chilperic II, King (715–717, 720–721)
Chlothar IV, King (717–720)
Theuderic IV, King (721–737)
Childeric III, King (743–751)

Auvergne (complete list) –
Ithier, Count (c.758)
Blandin, Count (760–763)
Chilping, Count (763–765)
Bertmond, Count (765–778)
Icterius, Count (778–?)
Guerin of Provence, Count (819–839)

Neustria of the Franks (complete list) –
Childebert III, King (695–711)
Dagobert III, King (711–715)
Chilperic II, King (715–721)
Theuderic IV, King (721–737)
Childeric III, King (743–751)

Duchy of Aquitaine (complete list) –
Odo the Great, Duke (c.688–c.735)
Hunald I, Duke (735–748)
Waifer, Duke (748–767)
Hunald II, Duke (767–769)
Lupo II, Duke (768–781)

County of Toulouse (complete list) –
Torson, Count (778–790)
William of Gellone, Count (790–806)

Eurasia: Caucasus

Kingdom of Abkhazia (complete list) –
Constantine I, King (c.680–710)
Theodor, King (c.710–730)
Constantine II, King (c.730–745)
Leon I, King (c.745–767)
Leon II, King (c.767–811)

Arminiya (complete list) –
Muhammad ibn Marwan, Emir (c.695–705)
Abd al-Aziz ibn Hatim al-Bahili, Emir (706–709)
Maslamah ibn Abd al-Malik, Emir (709–721)
al-Djarrah ibn Abdallah al-Hakami, Emir (721–725)
Maslamah ibn Abd al-Malik, Emir (725–729)
al-Djarrah ibn Abdallah al-Hakami, Emir (729–730)
Maslamah ibn Abd al-Malik, Emir (730–732)
Marwan ibn Muhammad, Emir (732–733)
Sa'id ibn Amr al-Harashi, Emir (733–735)
Marwan ibn Muhammad, Emir (735–744)
Ishaq ibn Muslim al-Uqayli, Emir (744–750)
Abu Ja'far Abdallah ibn Muhammad, Emir (750–753)
Yazid ibn Asid ibn Zafir al-Sulami, Emir (753–755)
Sulayman, Emir (755–?)
Salih ben Subai al-Kindi, Emir (c.767)
Bakkar ibn Muslim al-Uqayli, Emir (c.769–770)
al-Hasan ibn Qahtaba, Emir (770/771–773/774)
Yazid ibn Asid ibn Zafir al-Sulami, Emir (773/774–778)
Uthman ibn 'Umara ibn Khuraym, Emir (778–785)
Khuzayma ibn Khazim, Emir (785–786)
Yusuf ibn Rashid al-Sulami, Emir (786–787)
Yazid ibn Mazyad al-Shaybani, Emir (787–788)
Abd al-Qadir, Emir (788)
Sulayman ibn Yazid, Emir (788–799)
Yazid ibn Mazyad al-Shaybani, Emir (799–801)

Gazikumukh Khanate (complete list) –
Shakhbal ibn Abdullah, Shamkhal (c.740)

Principality of Iberia (complete list) –
Guaram III, Prince (c.693–c.748)
Adarnase III, Prince (c.748–c.760)
Nerse, Prince (c.760–772, 775–779/780)
Stephen III, Prince (779/780–786)

First Kingdom of Kakheti (complete list) –
Stephanus II, Prince (685–736)
Mihr, Prince (736–741)
Archil “the Martyr”, Prince (736–786)
Ioanne, Prince (786–790)
Juansher, Prince (786–807)

Oceania

Easter Island

Easter Island (complete list) –
Tuu Ka(u)nga te Mamaru, King (?)
Takahita, King (?)
Ouaraa, King (c.800)

See also
 List of political entities in the 8th century

References 

Leaders
 
-